William Robinson Sapp (March 4, 1804 – January 3, 1875) was an American lawyer and politician who served two terms as a U.S. Representative from Ohio from 1853 to 1857. He is the uncle of U.S. Representative William F. Sapp of Iowa.

Biography 
Born at Cadiz, Ohio, Sapp moved to Knox County, Ohio, where he attended the public schools.
He engaged in the mercantile business in Danville.
He studied law.
He was admitted to the bar in 1833 and commenced practice at Millersburg, Ohio.
He served as prosecuting attorney of Holmes County, Ohio.
Presidential elector in 1844 for Clay/Frelinghuysen.
He moved to Mount Vernon, Ohio, in 1846.

Congress 
Sapp was elected as a Whig to the Thirty-third Congress and reelected as an Opposition Party candidate to the Thirty-fourth Congress (March 4, 1853 – March 3, 1857).
He was an unsuccessful candidate for reelection.

Later career and death 
Assessor of internal revenue for the thirteenth district 1869-1872.
He served as collector of internal revenue from 1872 until his death in Mount Vernon, Ohio, January 3, 1875.
He was interred in Mound View Cemetery.

Sources

 
 

1804 births
1875 deaths
People from Cadiz, Ohio
Whig Party members of the United States House of Representatives from Ohio
Opposition Party members of the United States House of Representatives from Ohio
1844 United States presidential electors
People from Millersburg, Ohio
People from Knox County, Ohio
Ohio lawyers
County district attorneys in Ohio
19th-century American politicians
People from Mount Vernon, Ohio
19th-century American lawyers